Kuravi is a village in Mahabubabad district of the Indian state of Telangana. It is located in Kuravi mandal.

Geography
Kuravi/Korvi is around 70 km away from Warangal by train and is around 11 km away from the Mahabubabad town.

References

Villages in Mahabubabad district
Mandals in Mahabubabad district